is a former Japanese football player.

Playing career
Asahina was born in Fujieda on August 20, 1976. After graduating from Doshisha University, he joined J1 League club Gamba Osaka in 1999. He played several matches as center back every season from first season. However he could not play many matches until 2002. In 2003, he moved to J2 League club Sagan Tosu. He played many matches as regular center back in 2 seasons. In 2005, he moved to Regional Leagues club Rosso Kumamoto. He played as regular player and the club was promoted to Japan Football League (JFL) from 2006. In 2008, he moved to Regional Leagues club Banditonce Kobe and played many matches. In 2008, he moved to JFL club TDK. He played many matches in 2 seasons and retired end of 2009 season.

Club statistics

References

External links

1976 births
Living people
Doshisha University alumni
Association football people from Shizuoka Prefecture
Japanese footballers
J1 League players
J2 League players
Japan Football League players
Gamba Osaka players
Sagan Tosu players
Roasso Kumamoto players
Blaublitz Akita players
Association football defenders
People from Fujieda, Shizuoka